The 2020–21 season was the 72nd season in Dinamo București's history, all of them played in the top-flight of Romanian football. Dinamo participated in the Liga I and the Cupa României.

Transfers

Transfers in

Transfers out

Loans in

Loans out

Competitions

Overview

Liga I

The Liga I fixture list was announced in August 2020.

Regular season

Table

Results summary

Results by round

Matches

Play-out

Table

Results summary

Results by round

Matches

Cupa României

Statistics

Appearances
Players with no appearances not included in the list.

Goalscorers

Disciplinary record

Friendly games

References

External links

FC Dinamo București seasons
Dinamo, București, FC